Luca Petrozzi (born 12 March 1995, in Bromley) is an English born Italian rugby union player. His usual position is as a Scrum-half, and he currently plays for London Scottish. 

For 2019–20 Pro14 season, he was named as Additional Player for Benetton. In 2020–21 Pro14 season he signed for Benetton until 2022.

In January 2015, Petrozzi was also named in the Italy Under 20 squad for the 2015 Six Nations Under 20s Championship and in 2018 in the Italy Sevens squad for the 2018 Rugby Europe Sevens Grand Prix Series.

References

External links 
All Rugby Profile
Eurosport Profile

1995 births
Living people
English rugby union players
Rugby union players from Bromley
Rugby union scrum-halves
Benetton Rugby players